Kostas Bakoyannis (born 16 March 1978) is a Greek politician. Having served as mayor of the town of Karpenisi, he was popularly elected Regional governor of Central Greece in the 2014 local elections. In June 2019, he was elected as the new Mayor of Athens starting from 1 September 2019.

Early life and education
Born 1978 in Athens to New Democracy politicians Dora and Pavlos Bakoyannis, Kostas Bakoyannis lost his father Pavlos in 1989, when he was assassinated by the leftist terrorist group,  Revolutionary Organization 17 November. He studied history and International Relations at Brown University and graduated from Harvard with a Master of Public Administration. He holds a PhD thesis at St Antony's College, Oxford, in the field of Political Science and International Relations. 
He speaks English and German. Kostas Bakoyannis’ articles are often published in the Greek and foreign press.

His uncle is the current Greek Prime Minister Kyriakos Mitsotakis, and his maternal grandfather was the former prime minister Konstantinos Mitsotakis.

Career

Mayor of Karpenisi
In August 2010, Bakoyannis announced to run for mayoral office as an independent candidate in the small town of Karpenisi in Evrytania, where his father had originally come from. New Democracy decided not to challenge Bakoyannis with a candidate of its own, though the party had expelled his mother Dora in May for voting in favor of the austerity measures proposed by the Papandreou government.

Kostas Bakoyannis won the local elections with 54.3%. In a To Vima interview he strongly defended the bailout deal stating that "where we have come to after all the crimes that the Greek political system made over the past 30 years, we had no choice but the Memorandum." He said that he wouldn't rule out joining the new Democratic Alliance party his mother had founded, and that "Greece needs suicidal governments ready to kill themselves to save the country."

Regional governor of Central Greece
During his third year as Mayor of Karpenisi, Bakoyannis decided to run for  the governorship of Central Greece, again as an independent. His decision to leave the Mayorship was initiated by a growing number of citizen’s voices  from the greater Central Greece area, not only Karpenisi, who saw the risks and the opportunities that were coming up ahead for their area in the next 5 year term of the new Governor, and wanted a results oriented, tested and tried candidate for the job.  He was however backed by New Democracy, which again nominated no  candidate of its own, and clearly won the 2014 regional election with 56.06% in the second round, defeating Syriza's candidate Evangelos Apostolou.

Mayor of Athens
Bakoyannis was elected Mayor of Athens after the local elections of 2019 and took office on 1 September 2019.

Other activities
 European Council on Foreign Relations (ECFR), Member

Personal life
He has four children, Pavlos, Olympia, Danai and Dimos.

References

1978 births
Politicians from Athens
Living people
Brown University alumni
Harvard Kennedy School alumni
Regional governors of Greece